Carrot River is a town located in east-central Saskatchewan (population: 1000) in Canada.  The administration office for the Rural Municipality of Moose Range #486 is located in Carrot River.

History 
The name Carrot River comes from the Plains Cree word for river of wild carrots, referring to the wild carrots growing along the Carrot River. Settlement was slow until the Canadian National Railway came in 1931 bringing farmers from the south. The building of roads and drainage ditches improved land conditions around Carrot River. It became a village in 1941 and incorporated as a town on April 1, 1948.

Demographics 

Economy 

In 1963, the Squaw Rapids Hydro-Electric was built 50 km north of Carrot River, forming Tobin Lake,  an excellent fishing and recreation area close to the town which attracts tourists from all over the world. It was renamed to E.B. Campbell Hydroelectric Dam in honour of E.B. (Bruce) Campbell, a former SaskPower president, who was the assistant chief engineer during the construction of this station. The dam consists of eight units with a combined generating capacity of 288 net MW.
	
The Weyerhaeuser sawmill once provided the town's largest source of employment. The operation has recently undergone a $14 million upgrade, although on February 20, 2008, Weyerhaeuser stated the mill would close permanently. In 2011, Edgewood Forest Products, after purchasing the mill, began production of wood for China.

Premier Sask Inc. harvests peat, a decayed matter and the precursor to coal and has a packing and shipping plant at Carrot River. Expanding markets for peat have allowed the Carrot River plant to expand. Premier Sask Inc. ships approximately 1.6 million cubic foot bales per year.

Attractions
 Carrot River is home to an acclaimed golf course at Pasquia Park, located 10 kilometres south of the town. 
The Dickson Hardie Interpretive Centre is home to Big Bert, the remains of a 92-million-year-old Terminonaris robusta crocodile, found near Pasquia Park on the shores of the Carrot River; these were the first such remains to be found in North America.
To the north of Carrot River is Tobin Lake, a top fishing and recreation lake created by the E.B. Campbell Hydroelectric Dam. Carrot River provides one of the few accesses to Tobin Lake and its many boat launches and beaches, as well as being the closest community to the hydroelectric station.

Sports
The town is also the home of the Carrot River Outback Thunder Junior B Hockey Team. Games located in Carrot River draw crowds of 100-200, and play-off games draw crowds of 300-500.

References

External links 

Towns in Saskatchewan